Boxholm Municipality is a municipality in Östergötland County in southeast Sweden. Its seat is located in the industrial town of Boxholm.

The present municipality was formed in 1971, when the market town (köping) Boxholm (itself instituted in 1947) was amalgamated with Södra Göstring and a parish (Rinna) from the dissolved municipality of Folkunga.

Localities
Boxholm (seat)
Strålsnäs

History
The earliest human traces are from the Stone Age, circa 8000 BC. From some later times, the Nordic Bronze Age, are several remains such as cists and gravefields. And from the Viking Age, ca 800–1,000 AD, are seven kept runestones.

After the christianisation of Sweden, churches were built in the 12th and 13th century, and several churches have their foundation from that time.

The name "Boxholm" is first to be found in the 16th century, as the name of a manor by Arvid Stenbock. Boxholm thus comes from "Bock's holm" (holm a modern Swedish and  Old Norse word for islet).

An iron works was constructed in 1754, and a community grew up around it. The major expansion were however made in the 1850–1900.

See also
Boxholm, Iowa

References

External links

Boxholm Municipality - Official site

 
Municipalities of Östergötland County